Sayoko Yamaguchi (Japanese: 山口小夜子, September 19, 1949 – August 14, 2007) was a Japanese model and actress.

Yamaguchi was a Yokohama native and a graduate of Sugino Gakuen's Dressmaker Gakuin design school in Tokyo.

Yamaguchi broke into the international modeling industry in the 1970s. She was one of the first Asians to be featured in the world's top fashion shows and magazines. Yamaguchi made her debut in Paris in 1972. She went on to work in New York City and other international cities. Newsweek Magazine named her one of the world's top six fashion models in 1977. That year, she was featured on the cover of Steely Dan's Aja album.

Yamaguchi went on to continue her career as a film and theater actress, as well as a costume designer.

Death
Yamaguchi died, aged 57, on August 14, 2007, of acute pneumonia.

External links
RTE: Japanese supermodel dies, aged 57

References

Japanese actresses
Japanese fashion designers
People from Tokyo
People from Yokohama
People of Shōwa-period Japan
1949 births
2007 deaths
Japanese female models
Japanese women fashion designers